Williella sauteri is a species of moth of the family Tortricidae. It is found in New Caledonia in the southwest Pacific Ocean.

References

	

Moths described in 1984
Archipini
Taxa named by Marianne Horak